P. aurantiaca may refer to:
 Pilosella aurantiaca, the fox-and-cubs, orange hawkweed, tawny Hawkweed, Devil's paintbrush or Grim-the-collier, a flowering plant species native to alpine regions of central and southern Europe
 Pseudomonas aurantiaca, a Gram-negative soil bacterium species

See also 
 Aurantiaca